"Man of Your Word" is a song performed by American contemporary worship collective Maverick City Music featuring Chandler Moore and KJ Scriven. The song was released on Christian radio on August 21, 2020 as the lead single to their debut studio album, Maverick City Vol. 3 Part 1 (2020). The song was written by Chandler Moore, Jonathan Jay, Nathan Jess, Jonathan Hay and Tony Brown. Tony Brown collaborated with Jonathan Jay in the production of the single.

"Man of Your Word" reached No. 18 on the US Hot Christian Songs chart. "Man of Your Word" was nominated for the Grammy Award for Best Contemporary Christian Music Performance/Song at the 2022 Grammy Awards.

Release
Maverick City Music released the radio version of the song in digital format on November 6, 2020.

Composition

Commercial performance
"Man of Your Word" debuted at number 50 on the US Hot Christian Songs chart dated May 9, 2020. The song fell off the chart and returned after eight weeks, at number 48. The song went on to peak at number 18 on the chart.

Accolades

Music video
The official music video for the "Man of Your Word" was premiered on YouTube via Tribl, April 17, 2020. This video was captured with the Maverick City Music Choir in Atlanta at 1971 Sounds as a part of a song share and recording night for Maverick City Vol. 3 Part 1.

Performances
On June 23, 2022, Maverick City Music performed "Man of Your Word" on their Tiny Desk Concert performance as part of NPR Music's commemoration of Black Music Month.

Charts

Weekly charts

Year-end charts

Release history

Other versions
 Nathan Jess released his own rendition of the song as a single with Leah McFall appearing as a featured vocalist.

References

External links
 

2020 songs
2020 singles
Maverick City Music songs
Chandler Moore songs
Songs written by Chandler Moore